Bergmark is a surname. Notable people with the surname include:

Bret Bergmark (born 1973), American mixed martial artist
Niclas Bergmark (born 2002), Swedish footballer
Orvar Bergmark (1930–2004), Swedish footballer, manager, and bandy player